The Scottish Naval and Military Academy in Edinburgh was a school opened on 8 November 1825 and closed in 1869. It catered mostly to young gentlemen intending a career with the Army, Navy or, especially, the forces of the East India Company.

In 1829 the Academy moved into the three-storey building (subsequently the Caledonian Hotel, since demolished) on Lothian Road opposite Castle Terrace, which it shared with the Royal Riding Academy.

A noted master at the Academy was James R. Ballantyne, later head master of the Sanskrit College in Benares (modern-day Varanasi), who from 1832 to 1845 taught "Persian, Hindoostanee and Arabic" from classical texts.

Another lecturer was William Swan, who taught mathematics and physics, and conducted some notable experiments at the Academy.

Other subjects taught were: Military Engineering: Fortifications, Military Drawing and Surveying; Drawing: Landscape and Perspective; Higher Mathematics; Navigation; Chemistry; Military Antiquities; Latin and Greek; Elementary Arithmetic and Book Keeping, Algebra and Geometry; Geography; Natural Philosophy and Navigation; History; Elocution; French, Italian, Spanish and Portuguese; Fencing, Gymnastics and Military Exercises with the Firelock and Broadsword.

Some notable alumni
John Cook, Scottish recipient of the Victoria Cross
Joseph Anderson Panton, Goldfields Commissioner and artist in Victoria, Australia
W. J. Macquorn Rankine, Scottish engineer and physicist
John McDouall Stuart, Australian explorer

References 

Educational institutions established in 1825
1825 establishments in Scotland
1869 disestablishments in Scotland
Defunct private schools in Edinburgh